The Tender Enemy (French: La Tendre Ennemie) is a 1936 French comedy film directed by Max Ophüls and starring Simone Berriau, Catherine Fonteney and Laure Diana.

The film's sets were designed by the art director Jacques Gotko.

Cast 
 Simone Berriau as Annette Dupont, l'ennemie
 Catherine Fonteney as La Mère
 Laure Diana as La Poule
 Jacqueline Daix as Line - la fille de l'ennemie
 Georges Vitray as Dupont
 Lucien Nat as Le Promis
 Pierre Finaly as L'oncle Émile
 Henri Marchand as Extra
  as Le Fiancé
 Camille Bert as Docteur Desmoulins

References

Bibliography 
 Williams, Alan L. Republic of Images: A History of French Filmmaking. Harvard University Press, 1992.

External links 

1936 comedy films
1936 films
French comedy films
1930s French-language films
Films directed by Max Ophüls
Pathé films
French black-and-white films
1930s French films